"Honey Pie" is a song by the English rock band the Beatles, from their 1968 eponymous double album The Beatles (also known as "the White Album"). The song was written entirely by Paul McCartney and credited to the Lennon–McCartney partnership.

Interpretation
The song is a direct homage to the British music hall style. It concerns a famed actress, called only by the term of endearment "Honey Pie", who becomes famous in the United States, and her old lover, who wishes for her to rejoin him in England. The premise – a humble admirer yearning for the return of his lover – is not unlike a typical music hall plot. To establish an appropriate, old-timey sound, the band added the third line, "Now she's hit the big time!", along with "crackles" taken from a 78 rpm record.
The song begins with a slower intro, and becomes fast after that.

Clarinet and saxophones
The song also contains a saxophone and clarinet arrangement. The clarinets, according to Alan W. Pollack, "produce water sprays in parallel thirds" and the saxophones play in tight harmony.

Recording
Recording began on 1 October 1968, at Trident Studios in London's Wardour Street. Only one take was recorded on the first day, although it is likely that a number of rehearsal attempts had previously been recorded and wiped. The next day, McCartney taped his lead vocals, and a lead guitar part was added. According to George Harrison, John Lennon played the guitar solo. The song's woodwind arrangement by George Martin was recorded two days later on 4 October. McCartney added a final vocal overdub at the end of the session.

Before recording sessions for the album began, the Beatles recorded a demo of Honey Pie at George Harrison's Esher home studios. This version contained slightly different lyrics and lacked the introduction of the final version. The demo was later released in 1996 on Anthology 3 and the 2018 Super Deluxe edition of The Beatles album.

Legacy
Coinciding with the 50th anniversary of its release, Jacob Stolworthy of The Independent listed "Honey Pie" at number 25 in his ranking of the White Album's 30 tracks. He wrote: "A catchy if uninspiring homage to music hall entertainment from a wartime-era that succeeds in feeling fresh." He called the song one of McCartney's weaker tracks.

Cover versions
The song has been covered by Alan Klein (1969), Barbra Streisand, Jack Sheldon, the King's Singers, Don Partridge, the Golden Gate Quartet, Tuck & Patti, and John Pizzarelli, among others.  In the 1978 film Sextette, Dom DeLuise  performed the song. Phish covered the song, with the rest of the "White Album", on the album Live Phish Volume 13.

In 2016 Wesley Schultz sang it in Beat Bugs episode 12b.

Personnel
The Beatles
Paul McCartney – vocal, piano 
John Lennon – rhythm guitar, lead guitar
George Harrison – six-stringed bass
Ringo Starr – drums

Additional musicians
George Martin – saxophone and clarinet arrangement
Harry Klein – saxophone
Dennis Walton – saxophone
Ronald Chamberlain – saxophone
Jim Chester – saxophone
Rex Morris – saxophone
Raymond Newman – clarinet
David Smith – clarinet

Notes

External links
 

The Beatles songs
Song recordings produced by George Martin
Songs written by Lennon–McCartney
Songs published by Northern Songs
Music hall songs
1968 songs